Central Chiangrai (Old CentralPlaza Chiang Rai) is a shopping mall in Mueang District, Chiang Rai, Thailand.

Anchors 
CentralPlaza Chiangrai The shopping mall has a total of 4 floors.
 Robinson Department Store
 Tops
 Major Cineplex 5 Cinema
 B2S
 Power Buy
 Officemate
 Supersports
 Food Park
 Escent Ville Chiangrai

See also
 List of shopping malls in Thailand

Notes

References 
 
 

Shopping malls in Thailand
Central Pattana
Shopping malls established in 2011
Buildings and structures in Chiang Rai province
2011 establishments in Thailand